Theodore George Osius III (born 1961) is an American diplomat and the former United States Ambassador to Vietnam.

Early life and education
Osius grew up in Annapolis, Maryland. He attended The Putney School in Vermont, graduating in 1979.

Osius attended Harvard University, where he wrote for The Harvard Crimson and attained a Bachelor of Arts in social studies. After graduating in 1984, he interned at the American University in Cairo for a year. He then worked as a legislative correspondent for Senator Al Gore from 1985 to 1987. Osius later attended the Paul H. Nitze School of Advanced International Studies at Johns Hopkins University, graduating with a Master of Arts in international economics and U.S. foreign policy in 1989.

In addition to English, Osius speaks Vietnamese, French and Italian, as well as a bit of Arabic, Hindi, Thai, Japanese, and Indonesian.

Career
Osius joined the U.S. Foreign Service in 1989. Osius' first assignment was in Manila, from 1989 to 1991. Other early assignments included Vatican City and the United Nations.

In 1996, Osius was among the first U.S. diplomats to work in Vietnam since the end of the Vietnam War. In 1997, he helped with the establishment of the U.S. consulate in Ho Chi Minh City. Osius returned to 1998 to advise Vice President Al Gore on Asian affairs. In 2001, Osius became regional environmental affairs officer at the U.S. embassy in Bangkok, Thailand. In 2004, he returned to Washington, D.C. to work as the deputy director of the Office of Korean Affairs in the Bureau of East Asian and Pacific Affairs. In 2008, Osius was assigned to New Delhi, India as political minister-counselor.

In 2009, Osius became the deputy chief of mission at the U.S. embassy in Jakarta, Indonesia.

Osius returned again to Washington in 2012 to work as a senior fellow at the Center for Strategic and International Studies. In 2013, he became an associate professor at National Defense University.

In May 2014, Osius was nominated by President Barack Obama to be U.S. ambassador to Vietnam. Osius was confirmed by the U.S. Senate in November 2014. As ambassador, Osius presented his credentials on December 16, 2014.

Personal life
Osius is openly gay. In 2004, Osius met his future husband, Clayton Bond, then a watch officer in the State Department's operations center, at a meeting of Gays and Lesbians in Foreign Affairs Agencies. They were married in 2006 in Vancouver, Canada. He and Bond have two children, a son and a daughter.

See also
List of LGBT ambassadors of the United States

References

External links
 

1961 births
Living people
Gay politicians
Ambassadors of the United States to Vietnam
Paul H. Nitze School of Advanced International Studies alumni
National Defense University faculty
People from Maryland
The Putney School alumni
United States Department of State officials
Gay diplomats
21st-century American diplomats
Obama administration personnel
United States Foreign Service personnel
LGBT ambassadors of the United States
LGBT people from Maryland
The Harvard Crimson people